Filippo Terracciano (born 8 February 2003) is an Italian professional footballer who plays as a midfielder for Serie A club Hellas Verona.

Club career 
Filippo Terracciano made his professional debut for Hellas Verona on the 15 December 2021 against Empoli in Coppa Italia. He did his Serie A debut against Empoli on 20 March 2022.

References

External links

2003 births
Living people
Italian footballers
Italy youth international footballers
Association football midfielders
Footballers from Verona
Hellas Verona F.C. players
Serie A players